Örby is a part of the town Kinna in Mark Municipality, Västra Götaland County, Sweden. The area has about 2,000 inhabitants and was formerly a locality of its own, but has grown together with Kinna.

Örby is the home of sports club IFK Örby.

Populated places in Västra Götaland County